The deep cervical vein (posterior vertebral or posterior deep cervical vein) accompanies its artery between the Semispinales capitis and colli.

It begins in the suboccipital region by communicating branches from the occipital vein and by small veins from the deep muscles at the back of the neck.

It receives tributaries from the plexuses around the spinous processes of the cervical vertebræ, and terminates in the lower part of the vertebral vein.

References

External links

Veins of the head and neck